Relations exist between Bahrain and Saudi Arabia. Relations between the two are close and friendly.

Today 

Both are Sunni monarchies with both a Sunni and Shiite population, and both are members of the Gulf Cooperation Council.  This became particularly important during the Arab Spring, when long-serving strongmen were toppled across the Middle East, and the Bahraini uprising seemed to threaten to do the same to the Bahraini monarchy. 

Citing fears of Iranian influence and its rights under the charter of the GCC, Bahrain's monarchy invited Saudi forces in to suppress the rebellion.  This was the first case of the GCC agreement on defense being used internally. Saudi Arabia was also concerned to prevent spread of discontent inside its territories.

See also 
 Foreign relations of Bahrain 
 Foreign relations of Saudi Arabia
 King Fahd Causeway

References

External links 
 Embassy of Saudi Arabia in Bahrain
 Embassy of Bahrain in Saudi Arabia

 
Saudi Arabia
Bilateral relations of Saudi Arabia